Kadi and Al Barakaat International Foundation v Council and Commission (2008) C-402/05 is a case concerning the hierarchy between international law and the general principles of EU law. It is also known as Kadi I to distinguish from a later related case, Kadi II (2013).

Facts
Mr Kadi, a Saudi resident with assets in Sweden, and Al Barakaat, a charity for Somali refugees, claimed that the freezing of their assets was unlawful. The seizures occurred without any court hearing, right of redress or allegation of wrongdoing. The UN Security Council had adopted resolutions under Chapter VII to freeze assets of people and groups associated with the Taliban and Osama bin Laden. The EU adopted regulations to give effect to which Sweden gave effect.

The claimants were named in the resolution and the regulation. They claimed that the regulation should be annulled under TFEU Article 263 and was a breach of human rights.

Judgment

Advocate General Opinion
In the Opinion of Advocate General Maduro, EU law did not need to unconditionally bow to international law if a possible consequence was a violation of basic constitutional principles.

General Court
The General Court held that the Regulation was valid. Although agreements with a non-members ordinarily prevail, they cannot prevail over provisions forming a core part of the constitutional foundations of the EU system. 
233–259, Security Council resolution was binding on all UN members (UN Charter Article 25) and prevailed over all treaties (Article 103). They must be carried out even if in conflict with EU treaties. 

Member states were parties to the UN Charter before the EU treaties and so TFEU Article 351(1) required fulfilment of the Charter obligations. That meant the resolution prevailed over EU law. The EU was not bound under international law, but it was bound in EU law, following from International Fruit Company (1972) Case 21-4/72, [1972] ECHR 1219. 
There was also no infringement of a jus cogens norm by the resolution.

Court of Justice
The Court of Justice held the regulation was invalid in EU law. The court had no jurisdiction to review the legality of Security Council Resolutions, but it could review EU regulations. The regulation was adopted to give effect to Member State obligations. Although under international law Security Council Resolutions prevail, under EU law the hierarchy of norms differs. It rejected that TFEU art 351 protected the Regulation from challenge. The Regulation was annulled in relation to Kadi, but effect maintained for a limited period.

Significance

The CJEU judgment reflected a choice between absolute acceptance of international law and the preference for its own constitutional requirements on the assumption that international law may still be in a state of development: a view widely held in the aftermath of the War on Terror and the 2003 invasion of Iraq. This contrasted to the US Supreme Court rule from Murray v The Schooner Charming Betsy, that an act of Congress ought never to be construed to violate the law of nations if other possible constructions are available or it was "fairly possible" to avoid conflicts.

See also
EU law
United Kingdom constitutional law

Notes

References

External links
 Opinion of Advocate General Poiares Maduro, 16.01.2008
 Judgement of the Court of Justice, 03.09.2008

United Kingdom constitutional case law
Court of Justice of the European Union case law